The Nigeria banana frog (Afrixalus nigeriensis) is a species of frog in the family Hyperoliidae. It is found in southeastern Guinea, Liberia, Ivory Coast, Ghana, and western Nigeria; it appears to be missing from Togo and Benin. Its natural habitat is primary rainforest, but it can also occur in farm bush. The eggs are laid on vegetation overhanging temporary ponds. It is threatened by habitat loss caused by agricultural encroachment, expanding human settlements, and logging. A high prevalence of Batrachochytrium dendrobatidis, the fungus causing chytridiomycosis that has been associated with amphibian declines elsewhere, has been demonstrated in specimens collected from the Okomu National Park in Nigeria.

Habitat
The Nigeria banana frogs natural habitats are forests and wetlands such as primary rainforests and regenerating secondary forests in elevations up to 1,000 m down to 0 m. Breeding takes place on leaves over temporary ponds once hatched tadpoles will fall into the water and develop.

References

nigeriensis
Amphibians of West Africa
Amphibians described in 1963
Taxonomy articles created by Polbot